Interstate 69 (I-69) is a proposed US Interstate Highway that will pass through the western part of the US state of Tennessee, serving the cities of Union City, Dyersburg, and Memphis. State officials have considered building parts of I-69 as a toll road. Currently, a  section of already-existing freeway in Memphis has been approved for the I-69 designation. A section near Union City is under construction.

Route description
From Fulton, Kentucky, I-69 is planned to continue to the southwest, replacing and bypassing existing U.S. Route 51, serving Union City, Dyersburg (where it will intersect I-155), Ripley, Covington, Millington, and Memphis.

On January 18, 2008, the Federal Highway Administration (FHWA) authorized the states of Mississippi and Tennessee to extend I-69 from the I-40/State Route 300 (SR 300) interchange in north Memphis to the I-55/I-69 interchange in Hernando, Mississippi; Tennessee has  signed the extension of the route, although Mississippi has.

Planned extension
I-69 in Tennessee has been divided into three of segments of independent utility (SIUs).

Tennessee considered legislation that would allow I-69 to be built as a toll road, thereby accelerating its design and construction timetable by several years should such legislation be approved. Tennessee's toll road legislation came as Congress withdrew $171 million (equivalent to $ in ) allocated for Tennessee highway projects, including funds for I-69, in 2007. This federal highway allotment was diverted to fund ongoing military operations in Iraq.

SIU 7
This SIU begins at the Kentucky–Tennessee border in Fulton and closely follows US 51 to Dyersburg. The  stretch between Dyersburg and Troy is at Interstate Highway standards—opening with the completion of I-155 west of Dyersburg. An additional  stretch north of Union City to within  of the Kentucky border is also a freeway. Thus, the vast majority of the work on SIU 7 will involve bypassing the  portion of US 51 between Troy and Union City (where it is currently a four-lane surface arterial with at-grade intersections) and redesigning the US 51/US 45 interchange in South Fulton. This stretch has been divided into five smaller sections. The first two sections make up the Troy Bypass, while the northern three sections represent the Union City Bypass.

The first construction contract was set for SIU 7 on October 30, 2009, covering Section 4 (middle leg of the Union City Bypass). The winning bid for constructing the  section between SR 21 and SR 5 northwest of Union City was awarded to Ford Construction Company of Dyersburg for $33 million (equivalent to $ in ). Construction on this section of the Union City Bypass began in the spring of 2010 and was completed in the summer of 2012. However, it will remain closed to traffic until adjacent sections are completed. , land acquisition and utility relocations were underway in all five sections from Troy to Union City. The Tennessee Department of Transportation (TDOT) awarded a construction contract for  Section 3 (southern leg of the Union City Bypass) in March 2016 and planned to let a second contract for Section 5 (northern leg of the Union City Bypass) in December 2016. Work began on Section 3 in June 2016.

There is no current timetable for letting contracts to construct the Troy Bypass (Sections 1 and 2). However, TDOT Commissioner John Schroer estimated in February 2013 that it would take around 10 years to gradually complete work on SIU 7 due to lack of funding.

This situation (and the next one below) regarding funding was solved on May 23, 2017 with the signing of the IMPROVE (Improving Manufacturing, Public Roads and Opportunities for a Vibrant Economy) Act. The legislation raised taxes and fees for drivers and others: $0.06 for regular fuel, $0.10 for diesel fuel, and $0.08 for liquefied and compressed natural gases (a total of $355 million). The state would get $250 million, counties $70 million, and cities $35 million. Most vehicle owners saw their registration fees go up by $5; private and commercial owners had their fees go up by $10, with ride-sharing exempt; and heavy truck operators would pay $20 more. Electric vehicle owners in Tennessee (about 2,500) would pay an additional $100 in registration and renewal fees (since they do not pay fuel taxes); hybrid-electric car owners are exempt from the extra charges. The new money would fund parts of I-69 in the state. The Union City sections (3, 4, and 5) of this segment are on track to be completed by 2023. The paving on the bypass began July 2021 and will be completed in 2023 which then the bypass will be completed. While TDOT has acquired the right-of-way and is finalizing design for the Troy portion (1 and 2), a timeline for construction has not yet been established.

SIU 8
SIU 8 proceeds south from Dyersburg, paralleling US 51 to a planned interchange with SR 385 (I-269) in Millington. To facilitate work on the draft environmental impact statement (EIS) for this segment, TDOT has divided SIU 8 into three smaller segments. In April 2006, TDOT has announced the preferred routing for the northern and southern subsections, favoring an alignment to the west of US 51. Meanwhile, studies are still ongoing for the central section, which include alignments both east and west of the existing US 51. Once TDOT identifies the preferred alignment for the central segment, it is expected that a supplemental draft EIS will be necessary before the final EIS can be prepared.

The routing of I-69 has been criticized by the state Sierra Club chapter for not making use of the existing right-of-way for US 51 and for potentially impacting the Hatchie River, a state-designated scenic river.

TDOT has suspended work indefinitely on segment 8 due to a lack of funding. TDOT has further stated that it does not intend to resume work on the Dyersburg–Millington section until Congress commits federal funding to complete environmental studies, right-of-way acquisition, and construction. However the revived completion of segment 7 of I-69 in northwestern Tennessee connecting to I-155 and I-55 will provide an unbroken freeway route from that region to Memphis. It will bypass the uncompleted segment 8 by following the west side of the Mississippi River before crossing the river into Memphis and linking to partly finished segment 9. TDOT officials determined "there would be value" in finishing just enough of I-69 to link it to I-55, a major north–south route that runs through Memphis

SIU 9
South of Millington, I-69 will intersect the I-269 Memphis Outer Beltway, then continue southwest, roughly parallel to US 51, then abruptly turn east near General DeWitt Spain Airport to connect with I-40 at the existing SR 300 interchange in the Frayser neighborhood. The Mississippi Department of Transportation (MDOT) has been working on widening I-55/I-69 between Hernando and the Tennessee state line, adding travel lanes in each direction, reconstructing bridges, and improving traffic flow at interchanges. Meanwhile, TDOT is reconstructing I-55 and I-240 from the Mississippi line to Memphis. With much of the route already built and at Interstate standards through Memphis, the FHWA authorized TDOT to sign I-69 over I-55, I-240, and I-40 on January 18, 2008; however, TDOT has  done so. However, it has and still is signed as an "I-69 FUTURE CORRIDOR".

TDOT has suspended work indefinitely on the unbuilt section between SR 300 and the proposed interchange with I-269 near Millington due to a lack of funding. TDOT has further stated that it does not intend to resume work on this section until Congress commits federal funding to complete environmental studies, right-of-way acquisition and construction.

Exit list
This exit lists includes exits from existing I-55, I-240, I-40, SR 300, I-155, and US 51. The I-69 designation has only been approved on the southern . I-69 is not currently signed along this route.

Auxiliary routes
There are to be two auxiliary routes of I-69 in Tennessee. The first, I-169 in Martin and Union City, will be a spur route that is currently designated as SR 22. The second, I-269, is a beltway around Memphis. Currently, I-269 is designated south of I-40. The northern segment of SR 385 is expected to be redesignated as I-269 in the future.

References

External links

 Tennessee
69
Transportation in Memphis, Tennessee
Transportation in Shelby County, Tennessee